Arthur Lakes (December 21, 1844—November 21, 1917) was an American geologist, artist, writer, teacher and Episcopalian minister. He captured much of his geological and palaeontological field work in sketches and watercolours. Lakes is credited with successfully deciphering much of the geology of Colorado and, as an economic geologist, guiding mineral exploration which was so important to the State.

Career
 

Lakes was a part-time professor at what later became the Colorado School of Mines. Having sent a fossilized vertebra specimen from the Morrison Formation in the Dakota Territory to Othniel Charles Marsh in 1877, he was then employed by Marsh to seek other discoveries, in the so-called Bone Wars. He went on to unearth fossilized remains of Stegosaurus, Apatosaurus, Camptosaurus, Tyrannosaurus rex and Allosaurus.

Although he was employed by Marsh, Lakes was visited by Marsh's Bone Wars opponent Edward Drinker Cope, while working at Como Bluff. Although it was the last thing he intended, Lakes was the cause of increased animosity between Cope and Marsh, by co-operating with both.  Lakes made the original discovery of the fossils in the formation of the Dinosaur Ridge near Morrison, Colorado. Lakes also drilled several test oil wells in the Golden and Morrison area, however they were not successful producing wells.

During this time, he also worked as a teacher at what is now the Colorado School of Mines and as a clergyman. When he retired from fossil hunting, he went on to work for the U.S. Geological Survey. He edited a succession of geological and mining journals. His byline appears on over 800 newspaper and journal articles. Lakes and his two well-educated sons eventually went into business as mining engineers, relocating from Colorado to Ymir, British Columbia in 1912. Arthur Lakes died there in 1917, still "tanned from the outdoors life he led."

Awards and honors
Lakes was inducted into the National Mining Hall of Fame in Leadville, Colorado, in September 2010.

The Arthur Lakes Library at the Colorado School of Mines is named in his honor.

Publications

References

External links

 Arthur Lakes Library website

1844 births
1917 deaths
American geologists
American artists
Artists from Colorado
Colorado School of Mines faculty
United States Geological Survey personnel
Alumni of The Queen's College, Oxford
Economic geologists